Luka Gugeshashvili (born 29 April 1999) is a Georgian professional footballer who plays as a goalkeeper for Azerbaijan Premier League club Qarabağ.

Career

Before the second half of 2015–16, Gugeshashvili signed for Polish top flight side Jagiellonia Białystok. In 2018, he was sent on loan to Georgian top flight club Dila. In 2019, Gugeshashvili was sent on loan to the reserves of Recreativo Granada in the Spanish La Liga. In 2020, he returned on loan to Georgian team Dila. Before the second half of 2021–22, he was sent on loan to Qarabağ in Azerbaijan. On 1 February 2022, Gugeshashvili debuted for Qarabağ during a 1-0 win over Keşla in Azerbaijan Cup.

References

External links
 

Living people
Expatriate footballers in Azerbaijan
Expatriate footballers in Spain
Qarabağ FK players
Association football goalkeepers
1999 births
FC Dila Gori players
Erovnuli Liga players
Footballers from Georgia (country)
III liga players
Jagiellonia Białystok players
FC Dinamo Tbilisi players
Club Recreativo Granada players
Expatriate sportspeople from Georgia (country) in Spain
Expatriate sportspeople from Georgia (country) in Azerbaijan
Expatriate sportspeople from Georgia (country) in Poland
Expatriate footballers in Poland